Stefano Carozzo (born 17 January 1979 in Savona) is a male Italian fencer. He won the bronze medal in the men's team épée event at the 2008 Summer Olympics.

References 

Italian male fencers
Fencers at the 2008 Summer Olympics
Olympic fencers of Italy
Olympic bronze medalists for Italy
1979 births
Living people
Medalists at the 2008 Summer Olympics
Olympic medalists in fencing